Joliette/Saint-Thomas Aerodrome  is located  east southeast of Saint-Thomas, Quebec, Canada.

See also
 Joliette Airport

References

Buildings and structures in Joliette
Registered aerodromes in Lanaudière